Dwe (Ꚁ ꚁ; italics: Ꚁ ꚁ) is a letter of the Cyrillic script. The Cyrillic letter has a protruding vertical stroke (upturn), as with Ghe with upturn (Ґ ґ Ґ ґ), in the upper left corner of De (Д д Д д).

Dwe was used in the old Cyrillic alphabet for the Abkhaz language, where it represented a labialized voiced alveolar stop . It corresponds to Дә in the new alphabet.

Computing codes

See also 
Д д : Cyrillic letter De
Cyrillic characters in Unicode

Cyrillic letters